John Aylmer (died 5 April 1672) was born in Hampshire, educated at Winchester College, and admitted as a perpetual fellow of New College, Oxford, after two years of probation. In 1652, he took degrees in civil law, that of doctor being completed in 1663, being then and before accounted an excellent Grecian, and a good Greek and Latin poet, as appears by this book, which he composed when a young man: Musae sacrae seu Jonas, Jeremiae Threni, & Daniel Graeco redditi Carmine (Oxon. 1652. oct.), and also by diverse Greek and Latin verses, dispersed in various books. He died at Petersfield on Good Friday, 5 April 1672, and was buried in the church at Havant in Hampshire.

Sources
Wood, Anthony A. and Philip Bliss. Athenae Oxonienses: an Exact History of all the Writers and Bishops who Have Had their Education in the University of Oxford; to which Are Added the Fasti, or, Annals of the Said University / by Anthony A Wood; with Additions, and a Continuation by Philip Bliss. new ed. London [et al.]: Rivington; Parker, 1813–1820. 6 pts. in 4 vols.

1672 deaths
Hellenists
English classical scholars
Writers from Hampshire
People educated at Winchester College
Fellows of New College, Oxford
Burials in Hampshire
Year of birth unknown
English male poets
17th-century English poets